Teresa Carmen Pimentel Peschiera (born 2 August 1961) is a Peruvian former volleyball player who competed in the 1980 Summer Olympics and in the 1984 Summer Olympics. She was a member of the Peruvian team that won second place in the World Championship in 1982.

References

External links
 
 

1961 births
Living people
Peruvian women's volleyball players
Olympic volleyball players of Peru
Volleyball players at the 1980 Summer Olympics
Volleyball players at the 1984 Summer Olympics
Volleyball players at the 1979 Pan American Games
Volleyball players at the 1983 Pan American Games
Pan American Games silver medalists for Peru
Pan American Games bronze medalists for Peru
Pan American Games medalists in volleyball
Sportspeople from Lima
Medalists at the 1979 Pan American Games
Medalists at the 1983 Pan American Games
20th-century Peruvian women